Events from the year 1721 in art.

Events
The Ascension Convent in Moscow is renovated by order of Tsar Peter I of Russia.

Paintings
Antoine Watteau – Pilgrimage to Cythera

Births
 January 17 – Charles Germain de Saint Aubin, draftsman and embroidery designer to King Louis XV (died 1786)
 August 10 – Dirk van der Burg, Dutch artist, landscape painter and watercolourist (died 1773)
 date unknown
 Francesco Albotto, Italian painter (died 1757)
 Jean Charles Baquoy, French engraver (died 1777)
 Charles Joseph Flipart, French painter and engraver (died 1797)
 Charles Grignion the Elder, British engraver and draughtsman (died 1810)
 Pietro Antonio Lorenzoni, Italian portrait painter (died 1782)

Deaths
April 20 – Louis Laguerre, French decorative painter working in England (born 1663)
July 18 – Antoine Watteau, painter (born 1684)
August 3 – Grinling Gibbons, English master wood carver (born 1648)
September 3 - Benoît Audran the Elder, French engraver (born 1661)
December 19 – Bonaventura Lamberti, Italian painter active mainly in Rome (born 1653)
date unknown
Giovanni Lorenzo Bertolotti, Italian painter active in Genoa (born 1640)
Francesco Antonio Caneti, Italian miniature painter (born 1652)
Andrea dell'Asta, Italian painter (born 1673)
John Faber the Elder,  Dutch portrait engraver active in London (born 1660)
Luigi Garzi, Italian painter (born 1638)
Giuseppe Ghezzi, Italian painter, active mainly in Rome (born 1634)
Nicola Malinconico, Neapolitan painter (born 1663)
Jose Risueño,  Spanish painter who helped decorate the cupola of the church in the Carthusian monastery (born 1640)

 
Years of the 18th century in art
1720s in art